Kuzan or Kevzan may refer to:
Kuzan, Gilan
Kuzan, Golestan
Kuzan-e Olya, Lorestan Province
Kuzan-e Sofla, Lorestan Province
Kuzan (One Piece), a fictional character